John Eubanks (born July 13, 1983) is a former professional American and Canadian football cornerback. He most recently played for the Saskatchewan Roughriders of the Canadian Football League (CFL). He was signed by the Washington Redskins as an undrafted free agent in 2006. He played college football at Southern Mississippi.

Eubanks has also been a member of the Winnipeg Blue Bombers and Calgary Stampeders.

Eubanks was charged with one count of conspiracy to commit wire fraud and health care fraud, two counts of wire fraud, and two counts of health care fraud by the United States Department of Justice on December 12, 2019. He initially pleaded not guilty to the charges, but changed his plea to guilty by July 2020. In October 2021, Eubanks was sentenced to 18 months in federal prison.

References

External links
 
Calgary Stampeders bio
Southern Miss Golden Eagles bio
Washington Redskins bio
Riders Add Eubanks to Secondary

1983 births
Living people
Sportspeople from Natchez, Mississippi
American football cornerbacks
Canadian football defensive backs
American players of Canadian football
Southern Miss Golden Eagles football players
Washington Redskins players
Winnipeg Blue Bombers players
Calgary Stampeders players
People from Mound Bayou, Mississippi
Players of American football from Mississippi